Percut Sei Tuan is a town and district of Deli Serdang Regency in the province of North Sumatra, Indonesia. The population of the town in 2001 was 17,863.  It is the district capital of the Percut Sei Tuan district.

Percut Sei Tuan District
It is composed of twenty 'villages' (most of which are suburban to Medan), set out below with their areas and their populations at the 2010 Census and 2020 Census. Twelve of these are urban villages (kelurahan - indicated by * after their name in the table below) and eight are rural villages (desa).

References

External links
 Indonesian Ministry of Public Works Website

Sumatra
Populated places in North Sumatra